Cotoneaster  is a genus of flowering plants in the rose family, Rosaceae, native to the Palaearctic region (temperate Asia, Europe, north Africa), with a strong concentration of diversity in the genus in the mountains of southwestern China and the Himalayas. They are related to hawthorns (Crataegus), firethorns (Pyracantha), photinias (Photinia), and rowans (Sorbus).

Depending on the species definition used, between 70 and 300 different species of Cotoneaster are described, with many apomictic microspecies treated as species by some authors, but only as varieties by others.

The prostrate species are mostly alpine plants growing at high altitudes (e.g.

Description
The shoots are dimorphic, with long shoots ( long) producing structural branch growth, and short shoots ( long) bearing the flowers; this pattern often developing a 'herringbone' form of branching.

The flowers are produced in late spring through early summer, solitary or in corymbs of up to 100 together. The flower is either fully open or has its five petals half open  diameter.  They may be any shade from white through creamy white to light pink to dark pink to almost red, 10–20 stamens and up to five styles. The fruit is a small pome  diameter, pink or bright red, orange or even maroon or black when mature, containing one to three (rarely up to five) seeds.  Fruit on some species stays on until the following year.

Wildlife value 
Cotoneaster species are used as larval food plants by some Lepidoptera species including grey dagger, mottled umber, short-cloaked moth, winter moth, and hawthorn moth. The flowers attract bees and butterflies and the fruits are eaten by birds.

Although relatively few species are native there, in the UK and Ireland, Cotoneaster species are used, along with the related genus Pyracantha, as a valuable source of nectar when often the bees have little other forage in the June gap. Bees adore Cotoneaster. The red berries are also highly attractive to blackbirds and other thrushes.

Cultivation and uses 
Cotoneasters are very popular garden shrubs, grown for their attractive habit and decorative fruit. Some cultivars are of known parentage, such as the very popular Cotoneaster × watereri Exell (Waterer's cotoneaster; C. frigidus × C. salicifolius), while others are of mixed or unknown heritage. 

The following species and cultivars have gained the Royal Horticultural Society's Award of Garden Merit:- 
Cotoneaster atropurpureus 'Variegatus'   
Cotoneaster conspicuus 'Decorus' 
Cotoneaster 'Cornubia'  
Cotoneaster lacteus   
Cotoneaster procumbens 'Queen of Carpets'   
Cotoneaster 'Rothschildianus' 
Cotoneaster salicifolius 'Gnom'  
Cotoneaster salicifolius 'Pink Champagne'  
Cotoneaster sternianus   
Cotoneaster × suecicus 'Coral Beauty' 
Cotoneaster × suecicus 'Juliette'

Invasiveness
Many species have escaped from cultivation and become invasive weeds where climatic conditions are suitable for them, such as the many Chinese species naturalised in northwestern Europe. C. glaucophyllus has become an invasive weed in Australia and California. C. simonsii is listed on the New Zealand National Pest Plant Accord preventing its sale and distribution because of its invasiveness.  On Portland, Dorset, UK, it has become invasive and is regularly culled to prevent damage to the Jurassic Coast.

Nomenclature and classification 
The genus name Cotoneaster derives from cotoneum, a Latin name for the quince, and the suffix -aster, 'resembling'. The name is correctly masculine, though in some older works it was wrongly treated as feminine, resulting in different name endings for many of the species (e.g.Cotoneaster integerrima instead of Cotoneaster integerrimus).

The genus is often divided into two or more sections, though the situation is complicated by hybridisation:
Cotoneaster sect. Cotoneaster (syn. sect. Orthopetalum). Flowers solitary or up to 6 together; petals forward-pointing, often tinged pink. Mostly smaller shrubs.
Cotoneaster sect. Chaenopetalum. Flowers more than 20 together in corymbs; petals opening flat, creamy white. Mostly larger shrubs.

Selected species

 Cotoneaster acuminatus Lindl.
 Cotoneaster acutifolius Turcz. – Peking cotoneaster
 Cotoneaster acutiusculus Pojark.
 Cotoneaster adpressus Bois – creeping cotoneaster
 Cotoneaster aestivalis (Walter) Wenz.
 Cotoneaster affinis Lindl. – purpleberry cotoneaster
 Cotoneaster afghanicus G.Klotz
 Cotoneaster aitchisoni C.K.Schneid.
 Cotoneaster alashanensis J.Fryer & B.Hylmö
 Cotoneaster alatavicus Popov
 Cotoneaster alaunicus Golitsin
 Cotoneaster albokermesinus J.Fryer & B.Hylmö
 Cotoneaster allanderi J.Fryer
 Cotoneaster allochrous Pojark.
 Cotoneaster altaicus J.Fryer & B.Hylmö
 Cotoneaster ambiguus Rehder & E.H.Wilson
 Cotoneaster amoenus E.H.Wilson – beautiful cotoneaster
 Cotoneaster amphigenus Chaten.
 Cotoneaster annapurnae J.Fryer & B.Hylmö
 Cotoneaster angustifolius Franch.
 Cotoneaster angustus (T.T.Yu) G.Klotz
 Cotoneaster antoninae Juz. & N.I.Orlova
 Cotoneaster apiculatus Rehder & E.H.Wilson – cranberry cotoneaster or apiculate cotoneaster
 Cotoneaster applanatus Duthie ex J.H.Veitch
 Cotoneaster arborescens Zabel.
 Cotoneaster arbusculus G.Klotz
 Cotoneaster argenteus G.Klotz
 Cotoneaster armenus Pojark.
 Cotoneaster arvernensis Gand.
 Cotoneaster ascendens Flinck & B.Hylmö – ascending cotoneaster
 Cotoneaster assadii Khat.
 Cotoneaster assamensis G.Klotz
 Cotoneaster astrophoros J.Fryer & E.C.Nelson – starry cotoneaster
 Cotoneaster ataensis J.Fryer & B.Hylmö
 Cotoneaster atlanticus G.Klotz
 Cotoneaster atropurpureus Flinck & B.Hylmö – purple-flowered cotoneaster
 Cotoneaster atrovirens J.Fryer & B.Hylmö
 Cotoneaster atuntzensis J.Fryer & B.Hylmö
 Cotoneaster auranticus J.Fryer & B.Hylmö
 Cotoneaster bacillaris Wall. ex Lindl. – open-fruited cotoneaster
 Cotoneaster baenitzii Pax
 Cotoneaster bakeri G.Klotz
 Cotoneaster balticus J.Fryer & B.Hylmö
 Cotoneaster bilokonii Grevtsova
 Cotoneaster bisramianus G.Klotz
 Cotoneaster bitahaiensis J.Fryer & B.Hylmö
 Cotoneaster blinii H.Lév.
 Cotoneaster bodinieri H.Lév.
 Cotoneaster boisianus G.Klotz – Bois's cotoneaster
 Cotoneaster borealichinensis (Hurus.) Hurus.
 Cotoneaster borealis Petz. & G.Kirchn.
 Cotoneaster brachypodus Pojark. ex Zakirov
 Cotoneaster bradyi E.C.Nelson J.Fryer – Brady's cotoneaster
 Cotoneaster brandisii G.Klotz
 Cotoneaster brevirameus Rehder & Wilson
 Cotoneaster brickelli J.Fryer & B.Hylmö
 Cotoneaster browiczii J.Fryer & B.Hylmö
 Cotoneaster bullatus Bois – hollyberry cotoneaster
 Cotoneaster bumthangensis J.Fryer & B.Hylmö
 Cotoneaster burmanicus G.Klotz
 Cotoneaster buxifolius Wall. ex Lindl. – box-leaved cotoneaster
 Cotoneaster californicus A.Murray bis
 Cotoneaster calocarpus (Rehder & E.H.Wilson) Flinck & B.Hylmö – Sikang cotoneaster
 Cotoneaster cambricus J.Fryer & B.Hylmö – wild cotoneaster
 Cotoneaster camilli-schneideri Pojark.
 Cotoneaster campanulatus J.Fryer & B.Hylmö
 Cotoneaster canescens Vestergr. ex B.Hylmö
 Cotoneaster capsicinus J.Fryer & B.Hylmö
 Cotoneaster cardinalis J.Fryer & B.Hylmö
 Cotoneaster cashmiriensis G.Klotz – Kashmir cotoneaster
 Cotoneaster cavei G.Klotz
 Cotoneaster chaffanjonii H.Lév.
 Cotoneaster chailaricus (G.Klotz) Flinck & B.Hylmö
 Cotoneaster chengkangensis T.T.Yu
 Cotoneaster chrysobotrys Hand. – Mazz.
 Cotoneaster chulingensis J.Fryer & B.Hylmö
 Cotoneaster chungtiensis J.Fryer & B.Hylmö
 Cotoneaster cinerascens (Rehder) Flinck & B.Hylmö
 Cotoneaster cinnabarinus Juz.
 Cotoneaster coadunatus J.Fryer & B.Hylmö
 Cotoneaster coccineus Steud.
 Cotoneaster cochleatus (Franch.) G.Klotz – Yunnan cotoneaster
 Cotoneaster commixtus (C.K.Schneid.) Flinck & B.Hylmö
 Cotoneaster comptus Lem.
 Cotoneaster confusus G.Klotz
 Cotoneaster congestus Baker – congested cotoneaster
 Cotoneaster conspicuus C.Marquand – Tibetan cotoneaster
 Cotoneaster convexus J.Fryer & B.Hylmö
 Cotoneaster cooperi C.Marquand – Cooper's cotoneaster
 Cotoneaster cordatus Focke
 Cotoneaster cordifolioides G.Klotz
 Cotoneaster cordifolius G.Klotz
 Cotoneaster coreanus H.Lév.
 Cotoneaster coriaceus Franch.
 Cotoneaster cornifolius Rehder & E.H.Wilson
 Cotoneaster cossineus Steud.
 Cotoneaster crenulatus (D.Don) K.Koch
 Cotoneaster creticus J.Fryer & B.Hylmö
 Cotoneaster crispii Exell
 Cotoneaster cuilus Lee ex K.Koch
 Cotoneaster cuspidatus C.Marquand ex J.Fryer
 Cotoneaster daliensis J.Fryer & B.Hylmö
 Cotoneaster dammeri C.K.Schneid. – bearberry cotoneaster
 Cotoneaster daralagesicus Grevtsova
 Cotoneaster davidianus hort. ex Dippel
 Cotoneaster decandrus J.Fryer & B.Hylmö
 Cotoneaster declinatus J.Fryer & B.Hylmö
 Cotoneaster degenensis J.Fryer & B.Hylmö
 Cotoneaster delavayanus G.Klotz
 Cotoneaster delphinensis Chatenier
 Cotoneaster denticulatus Kunth
 Cotoneaster dielsianus E.Pritz. ex Diels – Diels' cotoneaster
 Cotoneaster difficilis G.Klotz
 Cotoneaster discolor Pojark.
 Cotoneaster dissimilis G.Klotz
 Cotoneaster distichus Lange
 Cotoneaster divaricatus Rehder & E.H.Wilson – spreading cotoneaster
 Cotoneaster dojamensis J.Fryer & B.Hylmö
 Cotoneaster dokeriensis G.Klotz
 Cotoneaster drogochius J.Fryer & B.Hylmö
 Cotoneaster duthieanus (C.K.Schneid.) G.Klotz
 Cotoneaster elatus G.Klotz
 Cotoneaster elegans (Rehder & E.H.Wilson) Flinck & B.Hylmö
 Cotoneaster ellipticus (Lindl.) Loudon – Lindley's cotoneaster
 Cotoneaster emarginatus hort. ex K.Koch
 Cotoneaster emeiensis J.Fryer & B.Hylmö
 Cotoneaster encavei J.Fryer & B.Hylmö
 Cotoneaster eriocarpus hort.
 Cotoneaster erratus J.Fryer & B.Hylmö
 Cotoneaster erzincanicus J.Fryer
 Cotoneaster esfandiarii Khat.
 Cotoneaster esquirolii H.Lév.
 Cotoneaster estonicus J.Fryer & B.Hylmö
 Cotoneaster falconeri G.Klotz
 Cotoneaster fangianus T.T.Yu – Fang's cotoneaster
 Cotoneaster farreri Klotzsch
 Cotoneaster fastigiatus J.Fryer & B.Hylmö
 Cotoneaster favargeri J.Fryer & B.Hylmö
 Cotoneaster fletcheri G.Klotz
 Cotoneaster flinckii J.Fryer & B.Hylmö
 Cotoneaster floccosus (Rehder & E.H.Wilson) Flinck & B.Hylmö
 Cotoneaster floridus J.Fryer & B.Hylmö
 Cotoneaster fontanesii Grossh.
 Cotoneaster formosanus Hayata
 Cotoneaster forrestii G.Klotz
 Cotoneaster fortunei Wenz.
 Cotoneaster foveolatus Rehder & E.H.Wilson
 Cotoneaster franchetii Bois – Franchet's cotoneaster or orange cotoneaster
 Cotoneaster frigidus Wall. ex Lindl. – tree cotoneaster
 Cotoneaster froebelii Vilm.
 Cotoneaster fruticosus J.Fryer & B.Hylmö
 Cotoneaster fulvidus (W.W.Sm.) G.Klotz
 Cotoneaster gamblei G.Klotz
 Cotoneaster ganghobaensis J.Fryer & B.Hylmö
 Cotoneaster garhwalensis G.Klotz
 Cotoneaster genitianus Hurus. ex Nakai
 Cotoneaster gesneri Kirschl.
 Cotoneaster gilgitensis G.Klotz
 Cotoneaster girardii Flinck & B.Hylmö ex G.Klotz
 Cotoneaster glabratus Rehder & E.H.Wilson – glabrous cotoneaster
 Cotoneaster glacialis (Hook.f. ex Wenz.) Panigrahi & Arv.Kumar
 Cotoneaster glaucophyllus Franch. – glaucous cotoneaster
 Cotoneaster globosus (Hurus.) G.Klotz
 Cotoneaster glomerulatus W.W.Sm.
 Cotoneaster goloskokovii Pojark.
 Cotoneaster gonggashanensis J.Fryer & B.Hylmö
 Cotoneaster gotlandicus B.Hylmö
 Cotoneaster gracilis Rehder & E.H.Wilson
 Cotoneaster grammontii hort. ex K.Koch
 Cotoneaster granatensis Boiss
 Cotoneaster griffithii G.Klotz
 Cotoneaster guanmenensis J.Fryer
 Cotoneaster handel-mazzettii G.Klotz
 Cotoneaster harrovianus E.H.Wilson
 Cotoneaster harrysmithii Flinck & B.Hylmö
 Cotoneaster hebephyllus Diels
 Cotoneaster hedegaardii J.Fryer & B.Hylmö
 Cotoneaster henryanus (C.K.Schneid.) Rehder & E.H.Wilson – Henry's cotoneaster
 Cotoneaster hersianus J.Fryer & B.Hylmö
 Cotoneaster heterophyllus J.Fryer
 Cotoneaster hicksii J.Fryer & B.Hylmö
 Cotoneaster himaleiensis hort. ex Zabel
 Cotoneaster himalayensis hort. ex Lavallee
 Cotoneaster hissaricus Pojark. – circular-leaved cotoneaster
 Cotoneaster hjelmqvistii Flinck & B.Hylmö – Hjelmqvist's cotoneaster
 Cotoneaster hodjingensis G.Klotz
 Cotoneaster hookeri hort. ex Zabel
 Cotoneaster hookerianus hort. ex Lavallee
 Cotoneaster horizontalis Decne. – wall cotoneaster or rock cotoneaster
 Cotoneaster hsingshangensis J.Fryer & B.Hylmö – Hsing-Shan cotoneaster
 Cotoneaster hualiensis J.Fryer & B.Hylmö
 Cotoneaster humifusus Duthie ex J.H.Veitch
 Cotoneaster humilis Donn
 Cotoneaster hummelii J.Fryer & B.Hylmö – Hummel's cotoneaster
 Cotoneaster hunanensis J.Fryer & B.Hylmö
 Cotoneaster hupehensis Rehder & E.H.Wilson – Hupeh cotoneaster
 Cotoneaster hurusawaianus G.Klotz – Hurusawa's cotoneaster
 Cotoneaster hylanderi B.Hylmö & J.Fryer
 Cotoneaster hymalaicus Carriere
 Cotoneaster hylmoei Flinck & J.Fryer – Hylmö's cotoneaster
 Cotoneaster hypocarpus J.Fryer & B.Hylmö
 Cotoneaster ichangensis G.Klotz
 Cotoneaster ignavus E.L.Wolf
 Cotoneaster ignescens J.Fryer & B.Hylmö – firebird cotoneaster
 Cotoneaster ignotus G.Klotz – black-grape cotoneaster
 Cotoneaster improvisus Klotzsch
 Cotoneaster incanus (W.W.Sm.) G.Klotz
 Cotoneaster induratus J.Fryer & B.Hylmö – hardy cotoneaster
 Cotoneaster inexspectus G.Klotz
 Cotoneaster insculptus Diels – engraved cotoneaster
 Cotoneaster insignis Pojark.
 Cotoneaster insignoides J.Fryer & B.Hylmö
 Cotoneaster insolitus G.Klotz
 Cotoneaster integerrimus Medik.
 Cotoneaster integrifolius (Roxb.) G.Klotz – entire-leaved cotoneaster
 Cotoneaster intermedius (Lecoq. & Lamotte) H.J.Coste
 Cotoneaster japonicus hort. ex Dippel
 Cotoneaster juranus Gand.
 Cotoneaster kaganensis G.Klotz
 Cotoneaster kamaoensis G.Klotz
 Cotoneaster kangtinensis G.Klotz
 Cotoneaster kansuensis G.Klotz
 Cotoneaster karatavicus Pojark.
 Cotoneaster karelicus J.Fryer & B.Hylmö
 Cotoneaster kaschkarovii Pojark.
 Cotoneaster kerstanii G.Klotz
 Cotoneaster khasiensis G.Klotz
 Cotoneaster kingdonii J.Fryer & B.Hylmö
 Cotoneaster kirgizicus Grevtsova
 Cotoneaster kitaibelii J.Fryer & B.Hylmö
 Cotoneaster klotzii J.Fryer & B.Hylmö
 Cotoneaster koizumii Hayata
 Cotoneaster kongboensis G.Klotz
 Cotoneaster konishii Hayata
 Cotoneaster kotschyi (C.K.Schneid.) G.Klotz
 Cotoneaster krasnovii Pojark.
 Cotoneaster kullensis B.Hylmö
 Cotoneaster kweitschoviensis G.Klotz
 Cotoneaster lacei Klotzsch
 Cotoneaster lacteus W.W.Sm. – milkflower cotoneaster or late cotoneaster
 Cotoneaster laetevirens (Rehder & E.H.Wilson) G.Klotz
 Cotoneaster laevis hort. ex Steud.
 Cotoneaster lambertii G.Klotz
 Cotoneaster lamprofolius J.Fryer & B.Hylmö
 Cotoneaster lanatus hort. ex Regel
 Cotoneaster lancasteri J.Fryer & B.Hylmö
 Cotoneaster langei G.Klotz
 Cotoneaster langtangensis B.Hylmö
 Cotoneaster lanshanensis J.Fryer & B.Hylmö
 Cotoneaster latifolius J.Fryer & B.Hylmö
 Cotoneaster laxiflorus Jacq. ex Lindl.
 Cotoneaster lesliei J.Fryer & B.Hylmö
 Cotoneaster leveillei J.Fryer & B.Hylmö
 Cotoneaster lidjiangensis G.Klotz – Lidjiang cotoneaster
 Cotoneaster lindleyi Steud.
 Cotoneaster linearifolius (G.Klotz) G.Klotz
 Cotoneaster logginovae Grevtsova
 Cotoneaster lomahunensis J.Fryer & B.Hylmö
 Cotoneaster lucidus Schltdl. – hedge cotoneaster or shiny cotoneaster
 Cotoneaster ludlowii G.Klotz
 Cotoneaster luristanicus G.Klotz
 Cotoneaster macrocarpus J.Fryer & B.Hylmö
 Cotoneaster magnificus J.Fryer & B.Hylmö
 Cotoneaster mairei H.Lév. – Maire's cotoneaster
 Cotoneaster majusculus (W.W.Sm.) G.Klotz
 Cotoneaster marginatus (Loudon) Schltdl. – fringed cotoneaster
 Cotoneaster marquandii G.Klotz
 Cotoneaster marroninus J.Fryer & B.Hylmö
 Cotoneaster mathonnetii Gand.
 Cotoneaster matrensis Domokos
 Cotoneaster megalocarpus Popov
 Cotoneaster meiophyllus (W.W.Sm.) G.Klotz
 Cotoneaster melanocarpus Lodd. – black-fruited cotoneaster or black cotoneaster
 Cotoneaster melanotrichus (Franch.) G.Klotz
 Cotoneaster meuselii G.Klotz
 Cotoneaster meyeri Pojark.
 Cotoneaster microcarpus (Rehder & E.H.Wilson) Flinck & B.Hylmö
 Cotoneaster microphyllus Wall. ex Lindl. – small-leaved cotoneaster or rockspray cotoneaster
 Cotoneaster milkedandai J.Fryer & B.Hylmö
 Cotoneaster mingkwongensis G.Klotz
 Cotoneaster miniatus (Rehder & E.H.Wilson) Flinck & B.Hylmö
 Cotoneaster minimus J.Fryer & B.Hylmö
 Cotoneaster minitomentellus J.Fryer & B.Hylmö
 Cotoneaster minutus G.Klotz
 Cotoneaster mirabilis G.Klotz & Krugel
 Cotoneaster misturatus J.Fryer
 Cotoneaster mongolicus Pojark.
 Cotoneaster monopyrenus (W.W.Sm.) Flinck & B.Hylmö – one-stoned cotoneaster
 Cotoneaster montanus Lange ex Dippel
 Cotoneaster morrisonensis Hayata
 Cotoneaster morulus Pojark.
 Cotoneaster moupinensis Franch. – Moupin cotoneaster
 Cotoneaster mucronatus Franch. – mucronate cotoneaster
 Cotoneaster muliensis G.Klotz
 Cotoneaster multiflorus Bunge – showy cotoneaster
 Cotoneaster nagaensis G.Klotz
 Cotoneaster nakai Hayata
 Cotoneaster naninitens J.Fryer & B.Hylmö
 Cotoneaster nanshan M.Vilm. ex Mottet – dwarf cotoneaster
 Cotoneaster nantaouensis J.Fryer & B.Hylmö
 Cotoneaster nanus (G.Klotz) G.Klotz
 Cotoneaster narynensis Tkatsch. ex J.Fryer & B.Hylmö
 Cotoneaster nebrodensis (Guss.) K.Koch
 Cotoneaster nedoluzhkoi Tzvelev.
 Cotoneaster nefedovii Galushko
 Cotoneaster neo-antoninae A.N.Vassiljeva
 Cotoneaster neopopovii Czerep.
 Cotoneaster nepalensis hort. ex K.Koch
 Cotoneaster nervosus Decne
 Cotoneaster nevadensis Boiss. ex Steud.
 Cotoneaster newryensis Lemoine
 Cotoneaster niger (Wahlenb.) Fries
 Cotoneaster nitens Rehder & E.H.Wilson – few-flowered cotoneaster or pinkblush cotoneaster
 Cotoneaster nitidifolius Marquand
 Cotoneaster nitidus Jacques – distichous cotoneaster
 Cotoneaster nivalis (G.Klotz) G.Panigrahi & A.Kumar
 Cotoneaster nohelii J.Fryer & B.Hylmö
 Cotoneaster notabilis G.Klotz
 Cotoneaster nudiflorus J.Fryer & B.Hylmö
 Cotoneaster nummularioides Pojark.
 Cotoneaster nummularius Fisch. & Mey.
 Cotoneaster obovatus Osmaston
 Cotoneaster obscurus Rehder & E.H.Wilson – bloodberry cotoneaster or obscure cotoneaster
 Cotoneaster obtusisepalus Gand.
 Cotoneaster obtusus Wall. ex Lindl.
 Cotoneaster oliganthus Pojark.
 Cotoneaster oligocarpus C.K.Schneid.
 Cotoneaster omissus J.Fryer & B.Hylmö
 Cotoneaster orbicularis Schltdl.
 Cotoneaster orientalis (Mill.) Borbas
 Cotoneaster osmastonii G.Klotz
 Cotoneaster ottoschwarzii G.Klotz
 Cotoneaster ovatus Pojark.
 Cotoneaster pangiensis G.Klotz
 Cotoneaster pannosus Franch. – silverleaf cotoneaster
 Cotoneaster paradoxus G.Klotz
 Cotoneaster parkeri G.Klotz
 Cotoneaster parkinsonii Panigrahi & Arv.Kumar
 Cotoneaster parnassicus Boiss. & Heldr.
 Cotoneaster parvifolius (Hook.f.) Panigrahi & Arv.Kumar
 Cotoneaster peduncularis Boiss.
 Cotoneaster pekinensis (Koehne) Zabel
 Cotoneaster permutatus G.Klotz
 Cotoneaster perpusillus (C.K.Schneid.) Flinck & B.Hylmö – slender cotoneaster
 Cotoneaster poluninii G.Klotz
 Cotoneaster procumbens G.Klotz
 Cotoneaster prostratus Baker – procumbent cotoneaster
 Cotoneaster przewalskii Pojark.
 Cotoneaster pseudoambiguus J.Fryer & B.Hylmö – Kangting cotoneaster
 Cotoneaster racemiflorus K.Koch – redbead cotoneaster or rockspray cotoneaster
 Cotoneaster radicans G.Klotz – rooting cotoneaster
 Cotoneaster rehderi Pojark. – bullate cotoneaster
 Cotoneaster reticulatus Rehder & E.H.Wilson
 Cotoneaster rhytidophyllus Rehder & E.H.Wilson
 Cotoneaster roseus Edgew.
 Cotoneaster rotundifolius Wall. ex Lindl. – round-leaved cotoneaster
 Cotoneaster rubens W.W.Sm.
 Cotoneaster salicifolius Franch. – willow-leaved cotoneaster
 Cotoneaster salwinensis G.Klotz
 Cotoneaster sanbaensis J.Fryer
 Cotoneaster sandakphuensis G.Klotz
 Cotoneaster sanguineus T.T.Yu
 Cotoneaster sargentii G.Klotz
 Cotoneaster saxatilis Pojark.
 Cotoneaster saxonicus B.Hylmö
 Cotoneaster scandinavicus B.Hylmö
 Cotoneaster schantungensis G.Klotz
 Cotoneaster schlechtendalii G.Klotz
 Cotoneaster schubertii G.Klotz
 Cotoneaster serotinus Hutch.
 Cotoneaster shannanensis J.Fryer & B.Hylmö – Shannan cotoneaster
 Cotoneaster shansiensis J.Fryer & B.Hylmö
 Cotoneaster sherriffii G.Klotz – Sherriff's cotoneaster
 Cotoneaster sichuanensis Klotzsch
 Cotoneaster sikangensis J.Fryer & B.Hylmö
 Cotoneaster sikkimensis Mouill.
 Cotoneaster silvestrei Pamp.
 Cotoneaster simonsii Baker – Himalayan cotoneaster or Simons' cotoneaster
 Cotoneaster smithii G.Klotz
 Cotoneaster soczavianus Pojark.
 Cotoneaster soongoricus (Regel & Herder) Popov
 Cotoneaster sordidus G.Klotz
 Cotoneaster soulieanus G.Klotz
 Cotoneaster spathulatus (Michx.) Wenz.
 Cotoneaster splendens Flinck & B.Hylmö – showy cotoneaster
 Cotoneaster spongbergii J.Fryer & B.Hylmö
 Cotoneaster staintonii G.Klotz
 Cotoneaster sternianus (Turrill) Boom – Stern's cotoneaster
 Cotoneaster stracheyi Klotzsch
 Cotoneaster strigosus G.Klotz
 Cotoneaster suavis Pojark.
 Cotoneaster subacutus Pojark.
 Cotoneaster subadpressus T.T.Yu
 Cotoneaster subalpinus G.Klotz
 Cotoneaster submultiflorus Popov
 Cotoneaster suboblongus Gand.
 Cotoneaster subuniflorus (Kitam.) G.Klotz
 Cotoneaster suecicus G.Klotz
 Cotoneaster svenhedinii J.Fryer & B.Hylmö
 Cotoneaster taitoensis Hayata
 Cotoneaster taiwanensis J.Fryer & B.Hylmö
 Cotoneaster takpoensis G.Klotz
 Cotoneaster taksangensis J.Fryer & B.Hylmö
 Cotoneaster talgaricus Popov
 Cotoneaster tanpaensis J.Fryer & B.Hylmö
 Cotoneaster taoensis G.Klotz
 Cotoneaster tardiflorus J.Fryer & B.Hylmö
 Cotoneaster tauricus Pojark.
 Cotoneaster taylorii T.T.Yu
 Cotoneaster tebbutus J.Fryer & B.Hylmö
 Cotoneaster teijiashanensis J.Fryer & B.Hylmö
 Cotoneaster tengyuehensis J.Fryer & B.Hylmö – Tengyueh cotoneaster
 Cotoneaster tenuipes Rehder & E.H.Wilson – slender cotoneaster
 Cotoneaster thimphuensis J.Fryer & B.Hylmö
 Cotoneaster thymifolius Wall. ex Lindl. – thyme-leaved cotoneaster
 Cotoneaster tibeticus G.Klotz
 Cotoneaster tjuliniae Pojark. ex Peschkova
 Cotoneaster tkatschenkoi Grovtsova
 Cotoneaster tomentellus Pojark. – short-felted cotoneaster
 Cotoneaster tomentosus Lindl. – woolly cotoneaster
 Cotoneaster transcaucasicus Pojark.
 Cotoneaster transens G.Klotz
 Cotoneaster trinervis J.Fryer & B.Hylmö
 Cotoneaster tsarongensis J.Fryer & B.Hylmö
 Cotoneaster tumeticus Pojark.
 Cotoneaster turbinatus Craib
 Cotoneaster turcomanicus Pojark.
 Cotoneaster tytthocarpus Pojark.
 Cotoneaster undulatus J.Fryer & B.Hylmö
 Cotoneaster uniflorus Bunge – Altai cotoneaster
 Cotoneaster uralensis J.Fryer & B.Hylmö
 Cotoneaster uva-ursi G.Don
 Cotoneaster uva-ursinus (Lindl.) J.Fryer & B.Hylmö
 Cotoneaster uzbezicus Grevtsova
 Cotoneaster vandelaarii J.Fryer & B.Hylmö
 Cotoneaster veitchii (Rehder & E.H.Wilson) G.Klotz – many-flowered cotoneaster
 Cotoneaster vernae C.K.Schneid.
 Cotoneaster verokotschyi J.Fryer & B.Hylmö
 Cotoneaster verruculosus Diels
 Cotoneaster vestitus (W.W.Sm.) Flinck & B.Hylmö
 Cotoneaster victorianus J.Fryer & B.Hylmö
 Cotoneaster villosulus (Rehder & E.H.Wilson) Flinck & B.Hylmö
 Cotoneaster vilmorinianus G.Klotz – Vilmorin's cotoneaster
 Cotoneaster virgatus G.Klotz
 Cotoneaster vulgaris Hook.f.
 Cotoneaster wallichianus G.Klotz
 Cotoneaster wanbooyensis J.Fryer & B.Hylmö
 Cotoneaster wardii W.W.Sm. – Ward's cotoneaster
 Cotoneaster washanensis J.Fryer & B.Hylmö
 Cotoneaster wattii G.Klotz
 Cotoneaster wilsonii Nakai
 Cotoneaster yakuticus J.Fryer & B.Hylmö
 Cotoneaster yalungensis J.Fryer & B.Hylmö
 Cotoneaster yuii J.Fryer & B.Hylmö
 Cotoneaster yulingkongensis J.Fryer & B.Hylmö
 Cotoneaster yulongensis J.Fryer & B.Hylmö
 Cotoneaster zabelii C.K.Schneid. – cherryred cotoneaster or Zabel's cotoneaster
 Cotoneaster zaprjagaevae Grevtsova
 Cotoneaster zayulensis G.Klotz
 Cotoneaster zeilingskii B.Hylmö
 Cotoneaster zeravschanicus Pojark.
 Cotoneaster zimmermannii J.Fryer & B.Hylmö

Sources:

References

External links
 
 

 
Rosaceae genera
Bird food plants
Fruit trees